Chia Black Dragon is the eponymous anti-hero of a dark fantasy series of novels written by Stephen Marley. Chia is identified in the novels as "The most dangerous woman in the history of man". The term "Chinese Gothic" was coined to describe the world of Chia Black Dragon.

Character overview

Chia is a part-human, part-demon Chinese woman. She was born on the shores of north China in the 3rd millennium BC. Her mother, Chi, was human but her father, Glak, was the last of a monstrous prehuman race who possessed the capacity for "infinite flesh", i.e. the ability to transform into a bewildering variety of Lovecraftian metamorphoses. This ability has passed on to Chia in the modified form of "wild flesh" which rejuvenates her every few years, with the result that she ages about three years in every thousand (after having aged normally up to her twelfth year). In the months leading up to her wild flesh rejuvenations she becomes increasingly deranged and dangerous. At the time of the first Chia novel, Spirit Mirror, she is twenty years old in appearance but almost three thousand years old chronologically.

Chia, whose name means Twilight in a pre-Chinese language, and who later gained the title "Black Dragon" from her valley-home on Black Dragon Mountain, is very much a dark and light character, her spirit blighted in infancy by her father whom she later kills with the aid of her twin brother, Nyak. She and Nyak soon take different paths, Chia struggling (and constantly failing) to become fully human, Nyak aspiring to inherit the full powers of his father. As the centuries progress the twins become the bitterest of enemies.

Chia Black Dragon was brought up as a cannibal and psychic vampire by her father, and although she rejected the cannibalistic rituals of her childhood she still reverts to vampirism at times throughout her life, sometimes by choice. She never does quests but is spurred into action only by the desire to help a close friend or (more usually) destroy an enemy. Chia's lesbian nature is clearly stated in the novels but, with the exception of a scene in Shadow Sisters, there are no outright sexual encounters.
  
Although the Chia series definitely belongs in the darkest of the dark fantasy genre, the stories, and Chia herself, abound in quirky black humour that counterbalances the frequent eruptions of horror and violence. Chia is, for example, deliberately written as an anachronistic character, in speech and also in appearance (she strolls around ancient China and Rome in a modern black overcoat and wears sunglasses - both of her own design). She is, essentially, a modern character set in the past. Despite her daunting history as a former cannibal, sometime vampire, assassin etc., Chia nevertheless comes across as vulnerable as well as formidable. Self-loathing is a permanent feature of her personality. The other characters in the stories rarely see Chia's vulnerable side but the reader is frequently afforded an insight into her self-doubt and fears even as she is putting on an arrogant front to those around her.

To date, there are three Chia Black Dragon novels and also a planned Chia video game, Shadow. Two examples of artist David Hitchcock's concept artwork for Shadow, copyright Creative Reality Software and Stephen Marley, are included here. Set in 1889, they show Chia immediately before and during an ambush by her brother's henchmen.

Novels 

Spirit Mirror:  publisher HarperCollins (1988) 

Set in 2nd-century China at the end of the Han dynasty, this is the first and least typical of the Chia books. Spirit Mirror tells the story of a mirror haunting orchestrated by her twin brother, Nyak. Atmospheric, but rather too richly written, it recounts Chia's struggle against an insidious haunting spread through any reflective surface and her gradual realisation that her brother is behind the spreading evil. She discovers that Nyak's aim is to destroy the newly established religion of Buddhism in China. However, as in all the novels, Chia's own actions (in this case predicted by Nyak) almost bring about the very disaster she intends to avert. Although not as unconventional as the following novels, the narrative still features a great deal of the graphic violence, horror and mystical passages that characterise the later works, although the dark comedy elements are less in evidence here.

Mortal Mask:  publisher Random House (1991) 

Chia comes into her own in this tale of Nyak's resurrection in a sinister mansion in Silver Music Bay. It is in this book, the first full-fledged example of "Chinese Gothic", that Chia dons her anachronistic attire and launches full flood into modernistic dialogue. Set a few years after the conclusion of Spirit Mirror, the story of Mortal Mask starts with a wild ride of a prologue in which Nyak's devastated spirit, after a titanic battle with Chia, flies east to Silver Music Bay. Some time later, Chia begins to suspect that her brother may have survived what she had hoped was their final battle after Nyak's deadly servants, the Silver Brethren, invade her home on Black Dragon Mountain. She travels to a Taoist hermitage in Silver Music Bay and meets and falls in love with Xanthippe, an orphaned Nubian girl who accompanied her parents on their journey from Egypt. Prior to Chia's arrival, all manner of insidious hauntings have afflicted the hermitage and the surrounding coastline, and with Chia on the scene matters take a turn from bad to worse. Chia eventually tracks the source of the haunting to a mansion known as the House of Heaven, which she discovers is the location of her birth and infancy. She also realises the full extent of her father's evil nature and of Nyak's impending resurrection. Mortal Mask, which was acclaimed a 'masterpiece' in the Clute/Grant The Encyclopedia of Fantasy, is essentially a deeply layered ghost story that plays out a host of metaphysical themes in a narrative that drives Chia relentlessly to the edge of damnation and an impending apocalypse.

Shadow Sisters:  publisher Random House (1993) 

This is a full-scale epic, ranging from 7th-century Rome to China at the fall of the Sui dynasty. Chia has turned the Catholic Church upside down in her desperate (and insane) attempt to make herself pope in place of Pope Adeodatus I. Betrayed by one of her "disciples", Wittigis, she is forced to flee Rome and return to China after a centuries-long absence. Wittigis, self-renamed Crucifer, leads Chia's former disciples in a purportedly religious mission to China to destroy her, their quest motivated in reality by dark desires that none of the disciples care to admit. In China, Chia forms an intimate attachment to Nua, a young woman who belongs to a sort of all-female Chia fan club in which the members dress and try to act like their idol. Chia, at Nua's urging, agrees to assassinate the emperor, Yang Ti, to make way for the first emperor of the Tang dynasty. After encountering the sole disaffected member of Crucifer's followers, a man renamed Judas, Chia and Nua head for Yang Ti's southern capital of Chiang-tu (modern Yang-chou). It is in Chiang-tu that Chia discovers that Crucifer and his disciples have been transformed into non-human entities by a buried power in Shadow Hill (the site of the Buddhist monastery in Spirit Mirror) and have drawn Yang Ti and his court into an alternative and terrifying reality which threatens to absorb the world. The story reaches its climax as Chia shifts between realities and confronts an old, but unexpected, enemy.

Video game 
There is a Chia video game planned with Creative Reality Software, designed by Stephen Marley and provisionally titled Shadow. A companion novel to the game is expected.

External links 
 Stephen Marley official website

Fantasy novel series
Novels by Stephen Marley
Fictional vampires
Vampire novels
Characters in fantasy literature
Fictional lesbians
Dark fantasy
Fictional LGBT characters in literature